The New Zealand national cricket team toured Sri Lanka during the 2003 season, playing two Tests from 25 April to 7 May 2003. New Zealand was led by Stephen Fleming while Sri Lanka was led by Hashan Tillakaratne. Both tests were drawn.

New Zealand then competed against Sri Lanka and Pakistan in a triangular one-day tournament called the Bank Alfalah Cup. New Zealand won the tournament defeating Pakistan in the final.

Test series summary

1st Test

2nd Test

References

2003 in New Zealand cricket
2003 in Sri Lankan cricket
International cricket competitions in 2003 
2003
Sri Lankan cricket seasons from 2000–01